Louder and Funnier is a collection of essays by P.G. Wodehouse, first published as a book in the United Kingdom on 10 March 1932 by Faber and Faber, London.

Most of the essays, which cover a broad range of topics, derive from articles written for the American Vanity Fair magazine between 1914 and 1923. During much of this period, Wodehouse was the magazine's drama critic, but he also wrote many other articles, often as many as four in a single month, some under pseudonyms such as "P Brooke-Haven" and "Pelham Grenville"; many of the articles which provided material for the book were published originally under these pseudonyms.

For the purposes of the book, Wodehouse substantially rewrote the articles, excising some material and adding new material; several chapters in the book derive from material in two different articles written years apart.

In his introduction to the book, Wodehouse explained that he had borrowed the title from "the old story ... of the nervous after-dinner speaker" who is speaking in a faltering undertone when a voice demands "Louder, please", to be followed soon after by another voice requesting, "Louder, please, and funnier".

Contents
The Hollywood Scandal
To the Editor - Sir ...
My Gentle Readers
Thrillers
Fair Play for Audiences
Looking Back at the Halls
An Outline of Shakespeare
The Decay of Falconry
A Day with the Swattesmore
Prospects for Wambledon
Fashionable Weddings and Smart Divorces
Happy Christmas and Merry New Year
Thoughts on the Income Tax
Butlers and the Buttled
A Word about Amusement Parks
Roulette
Chemin de Fer
On Ocean Liners
Photographs and Photographers

References

External links
A detailed list of the contents, with prior appearances in magazines where applicable
The Russian Wodehouse Society's page, with a picture of the book cover and a list of the articles contained

Books by P. G. Wodehouse
1932 books
Works originally published in American magazines
Faber and Faber books